This is a list of the extreme points of Greece, the points that are farther north, south, east or west than any other location.

Mainland
Northernmost point — Trigono/Ormenio Border Crossing, Evros regional unit 
Northernmost settlement — Ormenio, Evros regional unit 
Southernmost point — Cape Tenaro, also Cape Matapan, the Peloponnese 
Southernmost settlement — Kokkinogia, the Peloponnese 
Westernmost point — Ftelia Bay (Ormos Ftelias), Thesprotia
Westernmost settlement — Skala Sagiadas, Thesprotia
Easternmost point — unnamed river island, Evros River, Evros regional unit
Easternmost settlement — Stathmos Pythiou, Evros regional unit

Entire Greece
Northernmost point — Gravia area, Evros regional unit 
Northernmost settlement — Ormenio, Evros regional unit 
Southernmost point — Cape Trypiti. It is also the southernmost point of Europe.
Southernmost settlement — Vatsiana
Westernmost point — Xilosermi beach, Othonoi, off Corfu
Westernmost settlement — Chorio, Othonoi, off Corfu
Easternmost point — islet of Strongyli, in the Megisti archipelago
Easternmost settlement — Kastellorizo, in the Megisti archipelago
Highest point — the peak of Mount Olympus, 2917 m
Lowest point — sea level 
Deepest point — Calypso Deep, Ionian Sea, -5267 m. It is also the deepest point of the Mediterranean Sea.

Historical
Upon liberation of Greece in 1830, the extreme points of the country were:

North: Psathoura island (39.498°N 24.181°E) in the Northern Sporades, NE of Alonnisos
South: Eschati (Mermengas) islet in the Cyclades, around 10 miles SW of Santorini
East: Amorgos island (36°50′N 25°54′E) and in particular the eastern tip thereof, east of Aegiali village
West: Forti islet in the Ionian Sea, in the narrow straits between the island of Lefkas (still under British rule) and the coast of Acarnania province of the Aetolia-Acarnania prefecture, to which it belonged

Upon granting of the Ionian Islands to Greece in 1864 the extreme points of the country were modified as follows:

North & West: Sazan Island (Sason, Saso) (40°30′N 19°17′E) at the entrance of the Bay of Vlorë (Aulon, Avlona)
South: Antikythera (35°52′N 23°18′E)

See also 
Extreme points of Earth
Geography of Greece

References

Geography of Greece
Greece
Extreme